The 1924 Paris–Tours was the 19th edition of the Paris–Tours cycle race and was held on 4 May 1924. The race started in Paris and finished in Tours. The race was won by Louis Mottiat.

General classification

References

1924 in French sport
1924
May 1924 sports events